Barneystrombus is a genus of sea snails, marine gastropod mollusks in the family Strombidae, the true conchs.

Species
Barneystrombus boholensis (Mühlhäusser, 1981)
Barneystrombus kleckhamae (Cernohorsky, 1971)

References

Strombidae